"Crossword Puzzle" is a song written by Steve Dean and Frank J. Myers, and recorded by American country music artist Barbara Mandrell. It was released in September 1984 as the third single from the album Clean Cut. It reached the top ten of the American country songs chart.

Background and recording
In the 1980s, Barbara Mandrell had a series of number one and top ten country singles. With a collaboration from producer Tom Collins, Mandrell had her biggest success as a country music artist during this period. One of the singles she cut during this period was 1984's "Crossword Puzzle". It was written by Steve Dean and Frank J. Myers. Collins produced the track's recording session in January 1984 in Nashville, Tennessee.

Release and chart performance
"Crossword Puzzle" was released as a single on MCA Records in September 1984. It was backed on the B-side by the song "If It's Not One Thing It's Another". The track was issued by the label as a seven inch vinyl single. The single spent 20 weeks on America's Billboard country songs chart, peaking at number 11 by December 1984. In Canada, the single climbed to into the top ten of the RPM country chart. The song was spawned from Mandrell's 1984 studio album titled Clean Cut.

Track listing
7" vinyl single
 "Crossword Puzzle" – 3:32
 "If It's Not One Thing It's Another" – 3:46

Charts

References

1984 singles
1984 songs
Barbara Mandrell songs
Songs written by Steve Dean
Songs written by Frank J. Myers
Song recordings produced by Tom Collins (record producer)
MCA Records singles